Bli Sodot ( lit. Without Secrets) was an educational television show broadcast on Israeli Educational Television during the years 1983–1986 and on reruns during the mid-1990s. The show was intended for lower grades of Elementary, seeking to help with their reading. The show was incorporated as an integral part of the school curriculum and was even accompanied by 10 study booklets and five enrichment booklets, published by the Center for Educational Technology (CET).

The first-of-its-kind educational television broadcasts intended to teach children to read and would visualize to the viewer the process of reading through songs and sketches led by some well-remembered characters such as Gashash Balash ("Probing Detective") and Itonish ("Newspaperman"). The show's hosts Hanny Nahmias, Oshik Levi, Nathan Nathanson, and Hanan Goldblatt, and several other actors who'd participated on the show such as Shula Hen, Ofra Haza, Galia Isay, and Matti Sari. Plasticine Animation clips, introducing the characters  "Alphy" and "Betty", were also featured.

In the days of only one channel, the show received extremely high ratings among children and is considered  one of Israeli Educational Television's classics. Its popularity led to a follow up series called BeSod HaYinyanim between the years 1991-1992. First graders would watch Bli Sodot while second graders would watch the BeSod HaYinyanim follow-up.

The show remains an integral part of Israeli culture, with 39% of elementary schools still using it in the classroom.

Characters
 Gashash Balash (Hanan Goldblatt)
 Itonaish (Nathan Nathanson)
 Hameltzar HaMuzar lit. The strange waiter (Nathan Nathanson)
 Quiz guides (Hanan Goldblatt — "Give a name" and "Bli Sodot quiz", and Hanny Nahmias — "I have a question")
 Flower shop seller (Hanny Nahmias)
 Sports broadcaster (Oshik Levi)
 Professor Yavin (Hanan Goldblatt)
 Word shop seller (Hanny Nahmias)
 Teacher (Oshik Levi)

Recurring themes
Episodes of the show were usually constructed with a standardized structure, which included learning of two new letters with similar Niqqud (Hebrew orthography).

A standard episode was built with two sketches, one for each letter, where objects are presented to have the learned letter within them, and repetition of the syllable and examples on the use of the letter in the word. On top of the known sketches and characters there were also repeated segments on each chapter intended for memorization of the letter, and several of them became part of Israeli popular culture.

 Three squares with one syllable and another square with an extra syllable are positioned on both sides of Itonaish, and he must identify the one which doesn't fit, sometimes with the aid of his friends.
 Two shadows (usually of Hanny Nahmias and a male partner) that would repeat the words learned in the previous sketch while breaking the word into two syllables and repeating it twice. This segment is especially notable as it is one of the show's most recognized segments. Breaking a word into its syllabic component and repeating it with different tones is an identifying mark of the Bli Sodot show.
 Alphy's plasticine character creates the words learned in a previous sketch. Children read out the word, but in some cases the plasticine character moves to remove the niqqud, an act which leads the voices to call out "What is he/she doing? How can you read that? Ahh, X stays as X!" (where X is the learned word) This repetition is also considered an identifiable part of the show.
 At the end of an episode, the characters come out from the last/previous aired sketch and walk into the studio that sometimes still has stage props from the first sketch of the show.

See also
 Parpar Nehmad

Notes

External links
 Bli Sodot, on Kan Educational.
 Bli Sodot, on Hebrew Wiki-quote.

Israeli children's television series
Education in Israel
Israeli Educational Television
1980s Israeli television series
1983 Israeli television series debuts
1986 Israeli television series endings